The Clarence A. Bingham School is a historic school building at 3 North Street in Bristol, Connecticut.  Built in 1916, the school served the city until 2010.  After a period of vacancy, the city sold it and the also-closed Clara T. O'Connell School to developers for conversion to senior housing in 2015.

The school was listed on the National Register of Historic Places in 2017.

See also
National Register of Historic Places listings in Hartford County, Connecticut

References

National Register of Historic Places in Hartford County, Connecticut
School buildings on the National Register of Historic Places in Connecticut
School buildings completed in 1916
Buildings and structures in Bristol, Connecticut
1916 establishments in Connecticut